Galium glaucum or waxy bedstraw is a plant species of the Rubiaceae. It is native to central Europe from Portugal to Ukraine, and sparingly naturalized in a few locations in North America (Quebec, Ontario, Connecticut and New Jersey).

Subspecies
Three subspecies are recognized:

Galium glaucum subsp. australe Franco - Spain and Portugal
Galium glaucum subsp. glaucum - France to Ukraine
Galium glaucum subsp. murcicum (Boiss. & Reut.) O.Bolòs & Vigo - southeastern Spain

References

External links
 
Tela Botanica
Naturspaziergang,  Galium glaucum / Blaugrünes Labkraut
Syringa, Blaugrüner Waldmeister, Galium glaucum "Hohenhewen" 
Go Botany, New England Wildflower Society, waxy bedstraw

glaucum
Flora of Austria
Flora of Spain
Flora of Portugal
Flora of Germany
Flora of Hungary
Flora of Poland
Flora of Ukraine
Flora of Switzerland
Flora of Bulgaria
Flora of Romania
Flora of Croatia
Flora of Serbia
Flora of Kosovo
Flora of Slovenia
Flora of Quebec
Flora of Ontario
Flora of Connecticut
Flora of New Jersey
Plants described in 1753
Taxa named by Carl Linnaeus
Flora without expected TNC conservation status